Devendrappa Ghalappa Jamadar is an Indian politician.

He was elected to the Karnataka Legislative Assembly from Chincholi as a member of the Indian National Congress.

Devendrappa was a minister in the Devaraj Urs cabinet and won the Chincholi seat three times in 1972, 1978 and 1983. He belongs to the Kabbaliga community.

References

State cabinet ministers of Karnataka
Indian National Congress politicians from Karnataka
People from Kalaburagi
Year of birth missing (living people)
Living people
Mysore MLAs 1972–1977
Karnataka MLAs 1978–1983
Karnataka MLAs 1983–1985